The 2015 West Lindsey District Council election took place on 7 May 2015 to elect members of West Lindsey District Council in England. This was on the same day as other local elections.

Result

Council composition
After the election, the composition of the council was:

Lab - Independent 
I - Independent 
LI - Lincolnshire Independents

Ward results

Bardney

Caistor & Yarborough

Cherry Willingham

Dunholme & Welton

Gainsborough East

Gainsborough North

Gainsborough South West

Hemswell

Kelsey Wold

Lea

Market Rasen

Nettleham

Saxilby

Scampton

Scotter & Blyton

Stow

Sudbrooke

Torksey

Waddingham & Spital

Wold View

By-Elections between May 2015 – May 2019

Cherry Willingham
A by-election was held on 29 September 2016 due to the resignation of Councillor Alexander Bridgwood.

References

2015 English local elections
May 2015 events in the United Kingdom
2015
2010s in Lincolnshire